The Canicattì massacre (or Canicattì slaughter) was a massacre that occurred in Canicattì, Italy following its capture by American forces.  During the invasion of Sicily in July 1943, eight unarmed Italian civilians were killed by U.S. troops. The town of Canicattì had already surrendered when U.S. troops entered, following heavy German bombardment during their withdrawal.

History
Upon arrival, U.S. troops received a report that civilians were looting a bombed factory and filling up buckets with the factory's products: food and liquid soap. At around six o'clock in the evening, Lieutenant Colonel George Herbert McCaffrey, the military governor of Palermo, and some military police arrived at the factory. McCaffrey fired into the crowd after it had failed to disperse. At least eight civilians, including an eleven-year-old girl, were killed though the exact number of casualties is uncertain.

See also
List of massacres in Italy
Allied war crimes during World War II

Notes

References

1943 in Italy
Conflicts in 1943
Massacres in 1943
Allied invasion of Sicily
Massacres in Italy
Massacres committed by the United States
Massacre
Mass murder in 1943
War crimes by the United States during World War II
July 1943 events
1943 murders in Italy

sv:Canicattìmassakern